Meimu (or Mei Mu, born 24 September 1963), real name , is a Japanese manga illustrator. While attending classes at Osaka University of Arts, he made his debut as a manga artist.  Meimu's talents have been featured in various genres of storytelling, from science fiction to horror. Some of his works have also appeared in the adult manga magazine Lemon People and the manga anthology series Petit Apple Pie. His wife is manga artist Misuzu Suzuki.. Meimu was the character designer for the first Star Ocean video game.

Works

References

External links
 

1963 births
Living people
Manga artists
Hentai creators
Video game artists
People from Kanagawa Prefecture
Osaka University of Arts alumni